Ian James Scott (30 July 1914 – 25 January 2010) was a British painter. His work was part of the painting event in the art competition at the 1948 Summer Olympics.

References

1914 births
2010 deaths
20th-century British painters
British male painters
Olympic competitors in art competitions
People from London
20th-century British male artists